A second opinion is a consultation with an additional physician for an alternative point of view.

Second opinion may also refer to:

 Second Opinion (TV series), an American medical program
 "Second Opinion" (Law & Order), an episode of Law & Order
 "Second Opinion" (Medium), an episode of Medium
 "Second Opinion" (The Sopranos), an episode of The Sopranos
 Trauma Center: Second Opinion, a video game
 Second Opinion, an album by Marvin Welch & Farrar
 Second Opinion, 2014 documentary film by Eric Merola about cancer theories of writer Ralph W. Moss
Second Opinion (2018 film), a film directed by Caroline Labrèche